Ringle is an unincorporated community located in the town of Ringle, Marathon County, Wisconsin, United States. Ringle has a post office and a Fire department, with a ZIP code of 54471.

History
A post office called Ringle has been in operation since 1891. The community was named for John Ringle, who owned land in the area.

References

Unincorporated communities in Marathon County, Wisconsin
Unincorporated communities in Wisconsin